Gary Blissett (born 29 June 1964) is an English former professional footballer who played as a forward.

He notably played in the Premier League for Wimbledon, and in the Football League for Crewe Alexandra,  Brentford and Wycombe Wanderers. He finished his career in Singapore and Germany with Sembawang Rangers and SV Elversberg respectively.

Career
Blissett scored over 100 league goals for Crewe Alexandra and Brentford. He picked up a Third Division title medal with Brentford in 1992.

In December 1992, Blissett was acquitted of grievous bodily harm after challenging for an aerial ball with Torquay United player John Uzzell in an away game at Plainmoor 12 months earlier. It was alleged by Uzzell that Blissett had deliberately elbowed him in the face, fracturing his eye socket, although the court did not agree with this. Blissett has always maintained that the incident was an accidental collision and video evidence of the challenge was deemed to show that Blissett kept his eyes on the ball and, furthermore, that in jumping to head an aerial ball, a player would typically raise one or both arms to gain height.

Blissett moved to Wimbledon summer 1993. He was mostly a substitute in his four seasons at Wimbledon, starting only ten matches and scoring three goals. He had a loan spell with Wycombe Wanderers during that time, and also a loan spell back at Crewe Alexandra, before leaving Wimbledon in 1997 for a brief spell with Sembawang Rangers in Singapore. He completed his playing career with a four-year spell in Germany at SV Elversberg.

Personal life
Blissett is based in Florida where he is the Director of Coaching for Florida Premier FC Zephyrhills.

Honours 
Brentford
 Football League Division Three: 1991–92

Individual
 Brentford Hall of Fame

References

External links

1964 births
Living people
English footballers
Footballers from Manchester
Association football forwards
Premier League players
English Football League players
Singapore Premier League players
Crewe Alexandra F.C. players
Wycombe Wanderers F.C. players
Brentford F.C. players
Wimbledon F.C. players
SV Elversberg players
Sembawang Rangers FC players
English expatriate footballers
English expatriate sportspeople in Singapore
Expatriate footballers in Singapore
English expatriate sportspeople in Germany
Expatriate footballers in Germany